Leanna Shuttleworth is a British high-altitude mountaineer.

In 2012, aged 19, Shuttleworth climbed Mount Everest and became the youngest British female mountaineer to reach the peak to date (2019). On summitting Everest on 20 May 2012, Shuttleworth was reported to have completed the Seven Summits challenge with her father, having scaled the highest mountain in each of the seven continents and becoming the youngest British female to do so.

In the years since, Shuttleworth has been known for public speaking on issues regarding mountaineering, and has been available as a motivational speaker. An article from 2 March 2013 quotes Shuttleworth: "I love trying to inspire, especially younger women, as climbing is so male dominated."

In 2013 Shuttleworth worked on fundraising efforts to aid charity centre, and through her blog and website has promoted and supported the Vitiligo Society.

See also
Bonita Norris

References

External links

British summiters of Mount Everest
1993 births
Living people